Sirsha Ray is an Indian cinematographer who works in Bengali, Hindi, Telugu and Tamil films. He collaborated with Aparna Sen, Kaushik Ganguly, Srijit Mukherji, Sujoy Ghosh, Suman Mukhopadhyay, Churni Ganguly and Raj Chakraborty. Some of his notable works include A Death in the Gunj, Nirbashito, Arshinagar, Shabdo, Maati and Rocketry: The Nambi Effect.

Filmography

Films

Web series

Awards 

 Filmfare Award for Best Cinematography for A Death in the Gunj

References

External links 
 

Living people
Indian cinematographers